Derreck Brooks (born May 14, 1994) is an American professional basketball player who currently plays for the Phoenix Hagen club of the German ProA league.

References

External links
Profile at League website
Central Arkansas Bears bio
Eurobasket.com Profile
 

1994 births
Living people
American expatriate basketball people in Germany
American men's basketball players
Basketball players from Portland, Oregon
Central Arkansas Bears basketball players
Phoenix Bears men's basketball players
Phoenix Hagen players
Small forwards